Pniel may refer to:

 Penuel, biblical place
 Pniel, Northern Cape, mission station on the Vaal River between modern Barkly West and Kimberley, South Africa.
 Pniel, Western Cape, settlement in South Africa, between Stellenbosch and Franschhoek.